Baby and Child Care may refer to:

The Common Sense Book of Baby and Child Care by Dr. Benjamin Spock
Pediatrics, the branch of medicine that deals with the medical care of infants, children, and adolescents
Child care, the care and supervision of babies and young children